Ľubomír Hagara (born 14 January 1985 in Bojnice) is a Slovak sprint canoeist. At the 2012 Summer Olympics, he competed in the Men's C-1 200 metres.

References

External links
 
 

Slovak male canoeists
Living people
Olympic canoeists of Slovakia
Canoeists at the 2012 Summer Olympics
1985 births
Sportspeople from Bojnice
European Games competitors for Slovakia
Canoeists at the 2015 European Games